Urodacus giulianii is a species of scorpion in the Urodacidae family. It is endemic to Australia, and was first described in 1977 by L. E. Koch.

Description
The holotype is 55 mm in length. Colouration is orange-brown to dark brown.

Distribution and habitat
The species occurs in arid central Australia – the southern Northern Territory, north-western South Australia and eastern Western Australia.

Behaviour
The scorpions dig deep spiral burrows in open ground.

References

 

 
giulianii
Scorpions of Australia
Endemic fauna of Australia
Fauna of the Northern Territory
Fauna of South Australia
Fauna of Western Australia
Animals described in 1977